
Ch'uxñaquta (Aymara ch'uxña green, quta lake "green lake", hispanicized spelling Chocñacota) is a lake in the Andes of Peru. It is situated in the Puno Region, Carabaya Province, Usicayos District.

References

Lakes of Peru
Lakes of Puno Region